The United Workers Party is a conservative political party in Saint Lucia currently led by former Tourism Minister Allen Chastanet, who defeated former Prime Minister Stephenson King in a July 28, 2013 leadership election. The party was led previously by Sir John Compton, the party's founder.

History
The party was formed before the 1964 general elections by an alliance of the People's Progressive Party and the National Labour Movement, a splinter group founded by three members (John Compton, Vincent Monrose, and Maurice Mason) from the ruling Saint Lucia Labour Party. They won the elections, taking six of the eight seats. They remained in power after winning elections in 1969 and 1974, before losing the 1979 elections to the Labour Party. They returned to power after winning 14 of the 17 seats in the 1982 elections, and remained in power after two elections in 1987 and one in 1992. The Labour Party won the 1997 and 2001 elections, but the UWP regained power in the 2006 elections. In 2011 the UWP lost the election to Labour but regained power in the 2016 elections, taking 11 of the 17 seats in the House.

The United Workers Party is a member of the Caribbean Democrat Union, the regional organisation of the global conservative International Democrat Union.

Leaders
John Compton (1964–1996)
Vaughan Lewis (1996–2005)
John Compton (2005–2007)
Stephenson King (2007–2013)
Allen Chastanet (2013–present)

United Workers Party Prime Ministers 
Symbol

 † Died in office

Electoral history

House of Assembly elections

References

External links
 Official website

Political parties in Saint Lucia
Political parties established in 1964
Christian political parties
Conservative parties